Andronicos Georgiou is an English professional footballer who plays as a midfielder or forward for Kings Langley.

Career
Georgiou joined Stevenage's academy aged 13, and progressed through the youth ranks at the club. He was a regular starter for the club's U18 side during the 2016–17 season, and subsequently signed his first professional contract with the Hertfordshire side in April 2017.

Ahead of the 2017–18 season, having trained with the first-team, Georgiou scored a hat-trick in a 4–4 pre-season friendly draw away at Biggleswade Town. He made his professional debut on 3 October 2017, coming on as a 62nd-minute substitute in Stevenage's 0–0 draw away at Milton Keynes Dons in the EFL Trophy. Georgiou made his Football League debut four days later, appearing as a late second-half substitute as Stevenage fell to a 1–0 away defeat to Crewe Alexandra.

Having made three appearances for Stevenage during the first half of the 2018–19 season, Stevenage managed Dino Maamria stated that Georgiou needed "to be playing week in week out to develop his craft". He subsequently joined Southern League Premier Division South club Kings Langley on loan on 18 January 2019. Alongside the loan move, Stevenage also stated that they had triggered an option to extend Georgiou's contract by a further year. He scored on his debut for Kings Langley in a 2–2 draw away at Weymouth a day after joining the club, scoring a 94th-minute penalty in the match to restore parity. Georgiou made 16 appearances during the loan spell, scoring four times.

Georgiou went on trial with Championship club Middlesbrough in July 2019. He played and scored for Middlesbrough's U23 team in a 7–1 victory over Bishop Auckland, although no move materialised.

On 19 September 2019, Georgiou was loaned out to St Albans City until January 2020. However, he was recalled on 15 November 2019 and instead loaned out to Hendon, also until January 2020. The deal was later extended until the end of the season.

On 29 September 2020, Georgiou was signed by Wycombe Wanderers following the launch of a ‘B Team’ Programme. On 12 May 2021 it was announced that he would leave Wycombe at the end of the season.

In October 2021, Georgiou signed for Haringey Borough. In December 2022, he removed to his former club, Kings Langley.

Personal life
Georgiou is of Greek Cypriot descent

Career statistics

References

External links

1999 births
Living people
Footballers from Greater London
English footballers
Association football forwards
Stevenage F.C. players
Kings Langley F.C. players
St Albans City F.C. players
Hendon F.C. players
Wycombe Wanderers F.C. players
Haringey Borough F.C. players
English Football League players
Southern Football League players
National League (English football) players
English people of Greek Cypriot descent